Marvin Essor (born 27 August 1981) is a retired Jamaican sprinter who specialised in the 400 metres. He won the gold medal at the 2005 Summer Universiade.

His personal best is 45.49 in 2005. Essor was also a representative for Jamaica at the 2008 Summer Olympic in Beijing, on the 4x400m team. A successful NCAA college athlete, Essor was a 7-time All-American and 4-Time National Champion while attending Abilene Christian University in Abilene, Texas. He was the 2005 NCAA Division II Indoor and Outdoor 400m Champion.

Competition record

References

1981 births
Living people
Jamaican male sprinters
Universiade medalists in athletics (track and field)
Universiade gold medalists for Jamaica
Medalists at the 2005 Summer Universiade